Road North is a constituency of the Anguillan House of Assembly. The incumbent is Merrick Richardson of the Anguilla Progressive Movement.

Representatives

Election results

Elections in the 2020s

|- class="vcard" 
  | style="background-color:"|
  | class="org" style="width: 130px" | AUF
  | class="fn" |Evalie Bradley
  | style="text-align:right;" | 238
  | style="text-align:right;" | 33.4
  | style="text-align:right;" | -16.7

Elections in the 2010s

Elections in the 2000s

Elections in the 1990s

Elections in the 1980s

External links
Anguillan government election website - constituency results

Constituencies of the Anguillan House of Assembly